Graham Kribs is an American theoretical particle physicist at the University of Oregon. He was elected a Fellow of the American Physical Society in 2015.

Early life and education 
Graham Douglas Kribs was born in 1971, the son of Robert and Margaret Kribs. 

Kribs did undergraduate work at the University of Toronto, and he participated in a Fermilab high energy physics program with Drasko Jovanovic. After that summer he "was hooked on high energy physics." He  earned a Ph.D. at the University of Michigan in 1998. His dissertation, supervised by Gordon L. Kane, was titled, Supersymmetric phenomenology, model building, and signals.

Career 
Kribs pursued studies at the Institute for Advanced Studies at Princeton, New Jersey, between 2003–2005, and again in 2013.

Kribs joined the University of Oregon Physics faculty in 2005 and was promoted to full professor in 2015. He serves there as Director of the Institute for Fundamental Science, which "enhances the experimental, theoretical, and astronomy research activities at the University of Oregon." His research interests have included, "new physics, supersymmetry, extra dimensions and black holes".

Selected publications 

</ref>

Awards, honors 
 2015 Elected Fellow of the American Physical Society. Citation: For contributions to our understanding of physics beyond the Standard Model, in particular theories with supersymmetry and extra generations of matter.
 2011 Ben Lee Fellow, Fermilab, "awarded to visiting theorists with outstanding achievements in particle physics".

References

External links 
 Official website
 . Mainz Institute for Theoretical Physics. (video, 1:31:32)
 . Mainz Institute for Theoretical Physics. (video, 1:29:51)

1971 births
American physicists
Theoretical physicists
University of Toronto alumni
University of Michigan alumni
21st-century American physicists
Living people
University of Oregon faculty
Fellows of the American Physical Society